The American Canal is an irrigation canal in the Upper Rio Grande Valley near El Paso, Texas. The canal supplies the majority of the raw water to El Paso’s Johnathan-Roger Water Treatment Plant. It also mitigates flooding in south El Paso neighborhoods. The canal travels along the Rio Grande for  where it flows into the Franklin Canal and the rest of the canal network. Construction of the canal dates back to 1938.

See also 
 Texas Irrigation Canals
 Franklin Canal (Texas)
 Riverside Canal

References 

Canals in Texas
Irrigation canals
Transportation buildings and structures in El Paso County, Texas